Statistics of Cambodian League for the 2007 season.

Overview
It was contested by 8 teams, and Naga Corp FC won the championship.

League standings

References
Cambodia - List of final tables (RSSSF)

C-League seasons
Cambodia
Cambodia
1